The 2006 NCAA Division I FCS football rankings are from the Sports Network Division media poll.

Legend

The Sports Network poll

Notes

References

Rankings
NCAA Division I FCS football rankings